Club Deportivo Honduras Progreso (commonly referred to as Honduras Progreso or simply Honduras), is a Honduran football club based in El Progreso, Honduras. It was founded in 1965 and currently plays in the Honduran Liga Nacional.

History

Club Deportivo Honduras
The club was founded in 1965 under the name Club Deportivo Honduras and is one of the League's founding clubs.  They were in top flight football until 1969 where they finished last and were relegated to Segunda División (Second Division), and soon after dissolved.

Honduras Progreso
After many years of absence in Honduran professional football, the club was brought back as Club Deportivo Honduras Progreso in 2011.

Former national goalkeeper Wilmer Cruz became manager in 2013 but only earned his coaching licence in summer 2013. In December 2015 they beat Motagua 4–1 to win the 2015 Apertura league title with The honduran coach, Héctor Castellón.

Achievements
 Liga Nacional
 Winners (1): 2015–16 A
 Runners-up (1): 2016–17 C
 Liga de Ascenso
 Winners (2): 2013–14 A, 2013–14 C

Rivalries
Not a big rivalry, but when Honduras Progreso was in Segunda División de Honduras they played a lot of friendlies and Copa del Supercampeon against Real España, those have been really good games. In second division Yoro FC, Juticalpa FC, Atlético Municipal, and Atlético de Choloma.

League and cups performance

International performance

All-time record v other clubs
 As of 9 August 2017

Current squad

Historical list of coaches

  Leonel Machado (-Aug 13)
  Wilmer Cruz (Aug 2013 – Mar 15)
  Héctor Castellón (Mar 2015–)
  Nerlin Membreno (September 2017 - December 2017)
  Horacio Londoño (December 2017 - June 2018)
  Mauro Reyes (June 2018 - December 2018)
  Hernán García (December 2018 - February 2019)
  Reinaldo Clavasquin (February 2019 - April 2019)
  Luis Alvarado (April 2019 - August 2019)
  Horacio Londoño (August 2019 - October 2019)
  Ovidio Fúnez (October 2019 - December 2019)
  Héctor Castellón (December 2019 - February 2020)
  Julio “Palomo” Rodríguez (February 2020 - July 2020)
  Mauro Reyes (August 2020 - October 2020)
  Fernando Araújo (October 2020 - May 2021)
  John Jairo López (July 2021 - Present)

References

 
Football clubs in El Progreso
Yoro Department
Football clubs in Honduras
Association football clubs established in 1965